ACM Transactions on Software Engineering and Methodology is a quarterly peer-reviewed scientific journal covering software engineering published by the Association for Computing Machinery since 1992. The editor-in-chief is Mauro Pezzè (Università della Svizzera italiana and Schaffhausen Institute of Technology). According to the Journal Citation Reports, the journal has a 2021 impact factor of 3.685.

References

External links

Transactions on Software Engineering and Methodology
Computer science journals
Software engineering publications
Quarterly journals
Publications established in 1992
English-language journals